A patinodrome is an arena for inline speed skating.  They are oval tracks similar to velodromes used for track cycling, but have flat straights and shallow-banked or no banked curves.  They are typically outdoors or under cover with open or partial walls.  Patinodromes are common in Europe, but rare in North America.

Design 

A patinodrome is generally about 160m to 250m in circumference and may be surfaced with asphalt, concrete or similar material. The curves may be banked.

List of patinodromes

UK 

 Tatem Park

Quebec 

 Sainte-Foy/Quebec, PQ Patinodrome - 418-653-6363

France 

 Saint-Brieuc-Brezillet (22000)
 Gujan-Mestras (33470)
 Pibrac (31820)
 Valence (82400)

Argentina 

 Patinódromo Municipal

External links 

 InterSports
 Pibrac Roller Skating
 Video

Inline speed skating venues
Speed skating